Trichosirius cavatocarinatus is a species of sea snail, a marine gastropod mollusc in the family Capulidae, the cap snails.

References

 Powell A. W. B., William Collins Publishers Ltd, Auckland 1979 

Capulidae
Gastropods of New Zealand
Gastropods described in 1940